East Renfrewshire (known as Eastwood from 1983 until 2005) is a constituency of the House of Commons, to the south of Glasgow, Scotland. It elects one Member of Parliament (MP) using the first-past-the-post system of voting.

Before 1997, the constituency was the safest Conservative seat in Scotland. In the 1997 Labour landslide, it was won by Jim Murphy who held the seat until Kirsten Oswald of the Scottish National Party was elected in the 2015 SNP landslide. In 2017, the constituency returned to Conservative control for the first time in 20 years, when it was gained by Conservative candidate Paul Masterton. However, in the 2019 election Oswald was re-elected, gaining the seat for the SNP once again.

The constituency has a mostly middle-class electorate and includes affluent areas.

History 
The constituency was created by the Redistribution of Seats Act 1885 for the 1885 general election. It was abolished for the 1983 general election, when it was partially replaced by the new Eastwood constituency.

The East Renfrewshire constituency was re-established for the 2005 general election, with the same boundaries as the previous Eastwood constituency. Despite the change of name, it is the only constituency in mainland Scotland whose boundaries were unchanged by the 2005 revision of Scottish constituencies.

Boundaries and local government areas 

As created in 1885, the constituency was one of four covering the area of the county of Renfrewshire (except the burgh of Renfrew and the burgh of Port Glasgow, which were components of Kilmarnock Burghs until 1918). The four constituencies were: East Renfrewshire, West Renfrewshire, Paisley and Greenock. Greenock was enlarged and renamed Greenock and Port Glasgow in 1974.

From 1885, the constituency consisted of the parishes of Eastwood, Cathcart, Mearns and Eaglesham, and part of the parish of Govan.

From 1918, the constituency consisted of "The Upper County District, inclusive of all burghs situated therein, except the burghs of Paisley and Johnstone, together with so much of the burgh of Renfrew as is contained within the parish of Govan in the county of Lanark."

The constituency was abolished for the 1983 general election, eight years after the creation of local government regions and districts in 1975. The new constituency, with revised boundaries, was called Eastwood.

In 1996, the area of the Eastwood constituency became, also, the East Renfrewshire unitary council area.

In 1999, a Scottish Parliament constituency was created with the name and boundaries of the Eastwood Westminster constituency.

In the widespread redistribution of Scottish seats for the 2005 general election, the name of the Eastwood Westminster constituency was changed back to East Renfrewshire.

Constituency profile and voting patterns
An outer suburban part of the Glasgow conurbation and the rural hinterland to the south-west of the city, East Renfrewshire is predominantly an affluent, middle-class commuter area with a high proportion of owner-occupiers and professionals. East Renfrewshire has the largest Jewish population of any constituency in Scotland, with almost half of Scotland's Jewish population living in that area.

At the 2014 Scottish independence referendum, East Renfrewshire returned a significant majority against Scottish independence; with a voter turnout of 90.4%, 41,690 votes were cast for "No" (63.2%) and 24,287 for "Yes" (36.8%). At the 2016 European Union membership referendum, a substantial majority of votes were cast in favour of the United Kingdom remaining in the European Union in East Renfrewshire, with a turnout of 76.1% there were 39,345 "Remain" votes (74.3%) to 13,596 "Leave" votes (25.7%).

The area was looked on as a safely Conservative seat before Jim Murphy of the Labour Party gained the seat (then known as Eastwood) during their landslide victory in 1997. East Renfrewshire was then subsequently viewed as a relatively safe Labour seat until the SNP gained the seat in their 2015 landslide victory.

In 2017, during what would prove to be their best performance at a general election in Scotland for 34 years, the Conservatives subsequently gained the East Renfrewshire seat at the 2017 snap general election; with Paul Masterton being elected with a majority of 4,712 (8.8%) votes over Kirsten Oswald of the Scottish National Party. However, at the 2019 general election; Oswald regained the seat for the SNP with a majority of 5,426 or 9.8%, establishing the seat as an SNP-Conservative marginal battleground.

Members of Parliament

Election results

Elections in the 2010s

Elections in the 2000s

Elections in the 1970s

Elections in the 1960s

Elections in the 1950s

Elections in the 1940s

Elections in the 1930s

Elections in the 1920s 

Alexander Munro MacRobert was appointed Solicitor General for Scotland on 31 December 1925.

Elections in the 1910s

Elections in the 1900s

Elections in the 1890s

Elections in the 1880s

See also 

 1926 East Renfrewshire by-election
 1930 East Renfrewshire by-election
 1940 East Renfrewshire by-election
 Eastwood (UK Parliament constituency) (1983–2005)

References 

Westminster Parliamentary constituencies in Scotland
Constituencies of the Parliament of the United Kingdom disestablished in 1983
Constituencies of the Parliament of the United Kingdom established in 1885
Constituencies of the Parliament of the United Kingdom established in 2005
Politics of Renfrewshire
Giffnock
Clarkston, East Renfrewshire
Politics of East Renfrewshire
Newton Mearns
Eaglesham